are traditional Japanese mechanized puppets or automata, made from the 17th century to the 19th century. The dolls' gestures provided a form of entertainment. The word  has also come to mean "mechanisms" or "trick" in Japanese. It is used to describe any device that evokes a sense of awe through concealment of its inner workings.

The name  is thought to come from the Japanese verb , which means "to pull, stretch, and move a thread".

History 

 were further developed in Japan after the introduction of European clock-making technology sometime in the early 17th century, during the Sengoku period. The gears and cams used in clock-making were used to create moving dolls. The country embraced the mechanized puppet performance as a form of entertainment, and it became popular during the Edo period, which was considered the golden age of  construction and use.

However,  gained widespread popularity through their use as part of floats during street festivals, such as the Toshogu Matsuri in Nagoya.

In 1662, clockmaker Takeda Omi completed the first ,  designed for stage performances, in the Dōtonbori neighborhood of Osaka. He then built several of these large puppets for theatrical exhibitions, and the theatre was passed down through several generations of his family.

In the 19th century, Tanaka Hisashige, the founder of Toshiba, gained a reputation by making technically sophisticated  puppets.

According to Kirsty Boyle, a student of one of the last  puppet masters in Japan, the  tradition focuses on the art of concealing technology with the belief that it would evoke feelings and emotions more effectively. It is also noted that, although the  puppet resembles the human figure, it has a form of decisive movement that features rapid shifts that cannot be captured by the naked eye.

Types 
Most of them were set on a table and performed a dance or beat drums, but some were designed to serve tea or sake.

There were also more inexpensive toys based on traditional . The tin toys that for a period were frequently made in Japan and sold for export were sometimes modeled after .

Some scholars note that the gestures and movements of the  have influenced Noh, kabuki and  theatre.

The most common example today of a  mechanism is a tea-serving robot, which starts moving forward when a cup of tea is placed on the plate in its hands. It moves in a straight line for a set distance, moving its feet as if walking, and then bows its head. The doll stops when the cup is removed. When it is replaced, the robot raises its head, turns around and returns to where it came from. It is typically powered by a wound spring made of whalebone, and the actions are controlled by a set of cams and levers.

Gallery

See also
Animatronic
Automaton

Japanese robotics
Tanaka Hisashige

References

External links

Karakuri.info English information site
 Karakuri puppets in Takayama Matsuri Festival  NHK (video)

Puppets
 
Science and technology during the Edo period
Performing arts in Japan
Japanese dolls
Japanese inventions
Historical robots
Robots of Japan
17th-century robots
Entertainment robots
Culture articles needing translation from Japanese Wikipedia